Slavko Milosavlevski (January 28, 1928 – October 14, 2012) was a Macedonian sociologist, dissident from the time of the Communism.

References

1928 births
2012 deaths
Macedonian sociologists
People from Jegunovce Municipality
Yugoslav dissidents